The Glimpses of the Moon is a 1922 novel by Edith Wharton.

It was made into a silent film of the same name in 1923, but this is now lost.

The title comes from Hamlet (I.iv). The novel is available in electronic versions.

References

1922 American novels
American novels adapted into films
Novels by Edith Wharton